The Nationalist is an Irish regional newspaper, published each Tuesday in Carlow. It has three comprehensive sections, containing news, sport and 'living' articles.

History
The first edition of The Nationalist and Leinster Times was published on Browne Street, Carlow in 1883. It later moved to 58 Dublin Street and then to its offices Tullow Street, which the newspaper occupied until December 2005. Between the demise of The Carlow Sentinel in 1921 and the start of The Carlow People in 1996, The Nationalist was Carlow's sole regional newspaper.
During the construction of the newspaper's new offices they used a space formerly occupied by a gym in Carlow Shopping Centre. The Nationalist moved into its new premises at Hanover House, Hanover, Carlow town, in early 2007.

The newspaper was part of the Thomas Crosbie Holdings group. Thomas Crosbie Holdings went into receivership in March 2013. The newspaper was acquired by Landmark Media Investments.

In December 2017, a sale was agreed to The Irish Times pending regulatory approval. In July 2018, the sale of the title to The Irish Times was complete.

Its current editor is Conal O'Boyle.

Current features

News
 Around Carlow Town by Elizabeth Lee
 East-West Link by Suzanne Pender
 Godfrey's Gospel by Michael Godfrey
 Looking South by Michael Tracy
 Times Past by Frank White

Sport
 Carlow GAA Scene
 Pádraig Amond column on soccer
 Where are they now by Kieran Murphy
 Racing
 Tee to Green
 Reports and features on the Carlow and District Football League

Living
 Top of the Class, The Nationalist schools' page
 The Box Office, The Nationalist guide to arts and entertainment
 Night Town, all the latest social pictures

Current writers

News
 Editor: Conal O'Boyle
 News editor: Suzanne Pender
 Elizabeth Lee

Sport
 Sports editor: John Foley
 Charlie Keegan
 Kieran Murphy

Commercial

Advertising
 Senior Business Development: Natasha Dawson
 Senior Sales Executive: Sue Nolan
 Sales Executive: Rosaleen Kearns
 Sales Executive: Nichola Butler

Sister publications
The paper has regional variations, The Laois Nationalist, and The Kildare Nationalist.

See also
 Brendan Murphy, columnist

Notes

1883 establishments in Ireland
Mass media in County Carlow
Newspapers published in the Republic of Ireland
Publications established in 1883
The Irish Times
Thomas Crosbie Holdings
Weekly newspapers published in Ireland